Good Bye Lenin! is a 2003 German tragicomedy film, directed by Wolfgang Becker. The cast includes Daniel Brühl, Katrin Sass, Chulpan Khamatova, and Maria Simon. The story follows a family in East Germany (GDR); the mother (Sass) is dedicated to the socialist cause and falls into a coma in October 1989, shortly before the November revolution. When she awakens eight months later in June 1990, her son (Brühl) attempts to protect her from a fatal shock by concealing the fall of the Berlin Wall and the collapse of communism in East Germany.

Most scenes were shot at the Karl-Marx-Allee in Berlin and around Plattenbauten near Alexanderplatz. Good Bye Lenin! received numerous honours, including 2003's European Film Award for Best Film and German Film Award for Best Fiction Film.

Plot
The film is set in East Berlin, in the period from October 1989 to a few days after German reunification in October 1990.

Alex Kerner lives with his mother Christiane, his sister Ariane, and her infant daughter Paula. Alex's father purportedly abandoned the family for a mistress in the West in 1978. His mother joined the Socialist Unity Party and devotes her time to advocating for citizens. While Christiane believes socialism can improve Germany and the world, her children are realistic. Alex is disgusted with the celebration of East Germany's 40th anniversary and participates in an anti-government demonstration. There he meets a girl but they are separated by the Volkspolizei before they can introduce themselves.

Christiane, seeing Alex being arrested and beaten, suffers a heart attack and falls into a coma because nobody initially comes to her aid. Visiting his mother in hospital, Alex finds that her nurse, Lara, is the girl from the demonstration. She and Alex begin dating shortly afterwards.

Erich Honecker resigns, Egon Krenz takes over, the borders are opened, the Berlin Wall falls, East Germany holds free elections, and capitalism comes to East Berlin. Alex begins working for a West German firm selling and installing satellite dishes. He befriends a western colleague, aspiring filmmaker Denis Domaschke. Ariane's university closes and she works at Burger King instead. She begins dating the manager, Rainer, who moves into their apartment.

After eight months, Christiane awakens from her coma. Her doctor warns her family that she is still weak and any shock might cause another, possibly fatal, heart attack. Alex resolves to conceal the profound societal changes from her and maintain the illusion that the German Democratic Republic is just as it was before her coma. He, Ariane, and Lara retrieve their old East German furniture from storage, dress in their old clothes, and repackage new Western food in old East German jars. The deception is increasingly complicated as Christiane witnesses strange occurrences, such as a gigantic Coca-Cola banner on an adjacent building. Denis and Alex create fake news broadcasts from old East German news tapes to explain these odd events. Alex and Ariane fail to find where Christiane keeps her life savings (in East German marks) in time to exchange them for West German marks before the deadline.

Christiane gets stronger and one day wanders outside while Alex is asleep. She sees her neighbours' old East German furniture stacked in the street, new West German cars for sale, advertisements for Western corporations, and a statue of Lenin being flown away by helicopter. Alex and Ariane take her back home and show her a fake newscast explaining East Germany is now accepting refugees from the West following an economic crisis there.

At the family dacha Christiane reveals her own secret: her husband had fled not for a mistress but because of the difficulties he faced for refusing to join the ruling party. The plan had been for the rest of the family to join him. Christiane, fearing the government would take her children if things went wrong, decided to stay. Contrary to what she had told her children, their father wrote many letters that she hid. As she declares her wish to see her husband one last time to make amends, she relapses and is taken back to hospital.

Alex meets his father, Robert, who has remarried, has two children, and lives in West Berlin. He convinces him to see Christiane one last time. Under pressure to reveal the truth about the fall of the East, Alex creates a final fake news segment, persuading a taxi driver (who resembles cosmonaut Sigmund Jähn, the first German in space and Alex's childhood hero) to act in the false news report as the new leader of East Germany and to give a speech about opening the borders to the West. However, unbeknownst to Alex, Lara had already recounted the true political developments to Christiane earlier that day.

Christiane dies two days later, outliving the German Democratic Republic by three days after German reunification. The family and friends scatter her ashes in the wind using a toy rocket Alex made with his father during childhood.

Cast

Development
For director Wolfgang Becker, work on Good Bye Lenin! began in the summer of 1999, but for screenwriter Bernd Lichtenberg, the work had already begun almost a decade earlier. Lichtenberg’s experience of the reunification period as a New West Berliner at a similar age to his protagonist Alex was formed into a story which already included many aspects of the later film, but first ended up "in the drawer" for a few years. He stated: “I had the feeling that it simply wasn’t the right time yet.” This only changed when he saw Becker's Life is All You Get (German: Das Leben ist eine Baustelle). Especially interested in the mix of sadness and comedy, which he himself also envisaged for his film, he believed he had found the right person to bring his idea to life. He was not mistaken.
"All of a sudden there was this energy", recalls producer Stefan Arndt during the recording of the 5-page synopsis with Becker. “We knew we could tell the story in just the way we would like to.”

Nevertheless, it was not an easy process to finish the script. It supposedly took them six drafts plus a few interim versions to complete the script. Lichtenberg wrote the first drafts by himself. He stayed in close contact with Becker who voiced his criticism, especially of the characters. This was an important point for both of them so it was one they argued over as they both wanted to tell the story “through the characters”. The character that underwent the most radical change was Denis, as he was changed from a main character to a side character. The role of Denis, who was previously conceived as an young overweight boy from Turkey who was to be married off against his will, became an amateur film maker, who is as boldly-imaginative as he is practical. After completing the script, which the screenwriter and producer worked on together towards the end, their collaboration was not over. During the actual filming, Lichtenberg was involved whenever Becker wanted more changes.

Soundtrack

The film score was composed by Yann Tiersen, except the version of "Summer 78" sung by Claire Pichet. Stylistically, the music is very similar to Tiersen's earlier work on the soundtrack to Amélie. One piano composition, "Comptine d'un autre été : L'après-midi", is used in both films.

Several famous East German songs are featured. Two children, members of the Ernst Thälmann Pioneer Organisation, sing "Unsere Heimat" ('Our Homeland'). Friends of Christiane's (living in the same building) follow with "" ('Build Up! Build Up!'), another anthem of the Free German Youth. The final fake newscast with Sigmund Jähn features a rousing rendition of the East German national anthem, "Auferstanden aus Ruinen".

Ostalgie
Alex creates fictional newscasts to reminisce about his earlier East German lifestyle as well as a communist environment. He goes out of his way to use East German products to fool his mother such as Spreewald gherkins and although this is for his mother, there is also a hint he himself is creating a fantasy in which he would like to live. Alex lived his whole life with this barrier; therefore the drastic change is hard for him unlike his older sister Ariane. Ariane quickly adopts the new Western ideals and lifestyle, but Alex experiences nostalgia for their former way of life. Ostalgie is a neologism for the nostalgia for a communist past which is a common theme in Good Bye Lenin! Alex shows signs of ostalgie when he begins to increasingly criticise the Western changes in themselves.

Recently, German-American historian Andreas Daum has suggested a new interpretation, moving beyond the paradigm of ostalgie. He argues that Alex’s efforts to present his mother with an alternate narrative of what happened during her coma are not meant to preserve a bygone state or falsify history. Instead, they use counterfactual history to cope with the unsettling experience of dramatic change. Alex’s charades are conduits that allow all characters, including himself, to move from what they have been familiar with toward a new future. In this view, Good Bye Lenin! does not reflect a nostalgic attachment to the past, nor its retrospective idealization, but the film demonstrates a creative way of handling societal transformations, even beyond the specific East German setting.

Reception
The film received strongly positive reviews, and has a rating of 90% on Rotten Tomatoes. Empire magazine gave the film four stars out of five, saying: "An ingenious little idea that is funny, moving and—gasp!—even makes you think." The magazine also ranked it 91st in "The 100 Best Films of World Cinema" in 2010.

Good Bye Lenin! is frequently contrasted with The Lives of Others, which was released three years later, in 2006. Both films portray the legacy of East Germany, but with decidedly different tones.

Accolades
Good Bye Lenin! was submitted for consideration for the Academy Award for Best Foreign Language Film, but not nominated.

Adaptation
An unofficial spiritual Indian remake of Good Bye, Lenin! was released 17 years later in the form of the Hindi-language comedy-drama Doordarshan, also referred to by its changed title Door Ke Darshan; written and directed by Gagan Puri, it explores a family's attempts to recreate a bygone era in order to prevent the family matron from suffering a shock when she recovers 30 years after having fallen into coma.

See also
 Spreewald gherkins, one of the foods Christiane wants
 Ostalgie, nostalgia for East Germany
 Dookudu, Indian-Telugu film with similar plot
 La Dolce Vita, origin of helicopter statue sequence
 List of submissions to the 76th Academy Awards for Best Foreign Language Film
 List of German submissions for the Academy Award for Best Foreign Language Film

References

Further reading
 Daum, Andreas W. (2023). "Good Bye, Lenin! (2003): Coping with Change ‒ and the Future in the Counterfactual". Deutsche Filmgeschichten: Historische Porträts, ed. Nicolai Hannig et. al. Goettingen: Wallstein, 2023, 221–227.

External links

  (US)
 
 
 
 

2003 films
César Award winners
Ostalgie
Peaceful Revolution
European Film Awards winners (films)
Films about communism
Films about the Berlin Wall
Films directed by Wolfgang Becker (director, born 1954)
Films scored by Yann Tiersen
Films set in 1978
Films set in 1989
Films set in 1990
Films set in Berlin
Films shot in Berlin
German coming-of-age comedy-drama films
German reunification
2000s German-language films
Sony Pictures Classics films
Tragicomedy films
2000s political comedy-drama films
2000s coming-of-age comedy-drama films
Rip Van Winkle-type stories
2003 comedy films
2003 drama films
Films set in West Germany
Films set in East Germany
Films about mother–son relationships
2000s German films